Priya Sethi is a leader of Bharatiya Janata Party and a minister of state in the Government of Jammu and Kashmir. She was president of Jammu and Kashmir BJP Mahila Morcha.

References

Bharatiya Janata Party politicians from Jammu and Kashmir
Living people
Jammu and Kashmir MLAs 2014–2018
State cabinet ministers of Jammu and Kashmir
Year of birth missing (living people)